Beloborodov, or Beloborodova (Белобородова), is a Russian surname. Notable people with the surname include: 

People
Aleksandr Beloborodov (1891–1938), Bolshevik revolutionary and communist politician
Afanasy Beloborodov (1903–1990), Soviet military commander and World War II general

Russian-language surnames